is a train station in Kashiba, Nara, Japan. This station has a transfer to Kintetsu Shimoda Station on Kintetsu Osaka Line.

Lines
  JR-West
  Wakayama Line

Layout
Kashiba Station has one side platform and one island platform.

Tracks

External links
 Official website 

Railway stations in Japan opened in 1891
Railway stations in Nara Prefecture